West Mouse (Welsh: Maen y Bugail) is an islet lying  off the north-west coast of Anglesey, Wales.

It is located in an area of notoriously strong tides. Because of this, at least three shipwrecks lie near it, making it a popular diving location. There is now a white beacon on the island which is used as a navigational aid if lined up with two other beacons, one on the Anglesey mainland and another on Coal Rock, an islet a mile and a half north. The area also host to species such as hornwrack, sea squirts and conger eels. The island is part of a set of three spread out along the north coast of Anglesey. The other two islands are Ynys Amlwch and Ynys Badrig.

The Welsh name Maen y Bugail translates into English as The Shepherd's Stone. This comes from a folklore tale in which a shepherd who was looking for his sheep was annoyed by a stone in his shoe. He took the stone out and threw it into the sea, the island arising at the place in which it landed.

References
Notes

External links 

Islands of Anglesey
Cylch-y-Garn